C.R. Patterson and Sons was an American automotive company, active from 1893 to 1939 primarily in Greenfield, Ohio and for one year in Gallia, Ohio. The first African American founded car company founded by Frederick Douglas Patterson, and named after his father Charles "Rich" Richard Patterson. They made the Patterson-Greenfield automobile.

History

Precursors 
Charles "Rich" Richard Patterson (1833–1910) founded a precursor companies to C.R. Patterson and Sons. Patterson had been born in 1833 to Charles and Nancy Patterson in Virginia.  The family moved to Ohio between 1841 and 1842.  The were listed in the 1850 census in Greenfield, Ohio, which was a busy station on the underground railroad. He initially worked at Dines and Simpson Carriage and Coach Makers Company, and learned blacksmithing.

Charles Patterson partnered with a local carriage builder, J.P. Lowe, a white man, and they created J.P. Lowe & Company in 1873. By 1888, the business employed 10 people, which was considered successful for its time. The United States was experiencing the Panic of 1893, a financial crisis and business was suffering. As a result, in 1893, the company was renamed as C.R. Patterson, Son, and Company after Patterson bought Lowe's shares and to mark the inclusion of his son Samuel to the business. Samuel Patterson fell ill in 1897, and died in 1899. His eldest son Frederick Douglas Patterson moved home to help with the business.

By 1900, the company was producing 28 different horse-drawn carriage styles including buggies, backboards, phaetons, surreys, and the popular doctor's buggy. They had 50 employees, and were able to manufacture approximately 500 horse-drawn carriages a year.

Automobile manufacturing 
After Charles Patterson's death in 1910, his son Frederick Douglas Patterson took over the carriage business and decided they needed to get into the "Patterson horseless carriage" business. At first they offered the service of repairing existing automobiles in the local area. On September 23, 1915, the first C.R. Patterson and Sons automobile was assembled, a two-door coupe. The first cars were sold for $685, with additional reports of the car selling for $850 (or $17,741 to $22,014 adjusted for inflation in 2021).

It is estimated they built somewhere between 30 and 150 vehicles, and none are known to have survived to present day.

Bus and truck manufacturing 
In 1918, C.R. Patterson & Sons halted their auto production and concentrated once again on the repair side of the business. By the 1920s, they started focusing on building and designing truck and bus bodies, which were fitted to chassis made by other manufactures. The company was renamed Greenfield Bus Body Company. Frederick Douglas Patterson died in 1932, and his son Postell Patterson (1906–1981) took over the business.

Most of the bus bodies were purchased by school boards in Southern Ohio, West Virginia, and Kentucky, as well as the Ohio Transit Company and used in Cincinnati and Cleveland.

In 1938, the company was reorganized under the name Gallia Body Company and the headquarters moved to Gallia, Ohio. Unable to raise enough money, the company closed in 1939.

Further reading

References

External links 

 Article: "Charles R. Patterson, Inventor born" from African American Registry (AAREG)

American automotive pioneers
Vehicle manufacturing companies established in 1915
African-American businesspeople
African-American history of Ohio
Defunct motor vehicle manufacturers of the United States
Defunct truck manufacturers of the United States
Brass Era vehicles
1910s cars